Leonard James Griffin Jr. (born September 22, 1962) is a former American football defensive end who played eight seasons in the National Football League for the Kansas City Chiefs. He was a 3rd round selection by the Chiefs in the 1986 NFL Draft out of Grambling State.

He retired from the NFL and took up teaching at West Ouachita High School. He began as a P.E. teacher and a Defensive Line Coach, before going into administration at the school. He retired from West Ouachita High School after the 2021-2022 school year.

External links
NFL.com player page

1962 births
Living people
People from Lake Providence, Louisiana
Players of American football from Louisiana
American football defensive ends
Grambling State Tigers football players
Kansas City Chiefs players